Luka Milunović (born 21 December 1992) is a Serbian footballer who plays as a midfielder for Serbian club Radnički 1923 Kragujevac in Serbian SuperLiga. In international competition he has played for the Serbia national under-21 football team.

Club career

Early career
Premature going abroad, he made earlier this player gaming mature. He can play the wing as well as the farthest forward. He was a member of all standard youth teams Serbian national team. Weak physical constitution in the younger categories made him uncompromising fighter, and this characteristic is now kept as a first team player. He joined the OFK Beograd senior team in the 2010–11 season, but made only 1 league appearances that season.

Zulte Waregem
In summer of 2011 he signed with Belgian Pro League team S.V. Zulte Waregem. For them he made 12 league appearances in the first half of 2011–12 season.

Red Star Belgrade
After only 6 months in Belgium he returned to Serbia to play for Red Star Belgrade. On 21 March 2012, he scored a goal against Red Star's arch rivals Partizan in the Eternal derby.

Aris
After 2 years with Platanias, he was released in July 2016. Despite some speculation linking him with AEK and PAOK he decided to join Aris on a three-year deal. On 25 October 2016 he made his debut in an away Cup win against Aiginiakos, scoring two goals and giving one assist. On 10 December 2017 he scored his first league goal in an easy 3–1 away win against Panelefsiniakos. On 8 January he scored the winner in a 2–1 home win against Panegialios. Ten days later he sealed a 4–0 home win against Panserraikos. On 28 January 2017 he scored the only goal in a home derby win against OFI. On 31 August 2018, he terminated his contract by mutual consent.

Sabah FA
In 2019 season of Malaysian Premier League, he sign with Sabah FA on 1-year contract. He joined another Serbia Rodoljub Paunović and South Korean defender Park Tae-soo as a foreign player at the club.

International career
On 5 September 2013, Milunović scored two goals against Cyprus U21 playing for Serbia U21 in the 2015 UEFA European Under-21 Football Championship qualification. Just a month later on 15 October 2013, he continued his good form in the same tournament scoring a goal against Northern Ireland U21.

Career statistics

Honours
Red Star
Serbian SuperLiga (1): 2013–14
Serbian Cup (1): 2011–12

References

External links
 Luka Milunović at Utakmica.rs 

1992 births
Living people
Footballers from Belgrade
Serbian footballers
Association football forwards
Serbia under-21 international footballers
OFK Beograd players
S.V. Zulte Waregem players
Red Star Belgrade footballers
Platanias F.C. players
Aris Thessaloniki F.C. players
FK Voždovac players
Melaka United F.C. players
Sabah F.C. (Malaysia) players
Debreceni VSC players
FK Napredak Kruševac players
FK Kukësi players
Niki Volos F.C. players
Serbian SuperLiga players
Belgian Pro League players
Super League Greece players
Football League (Greece) players
Malaysia Super League players
Nemzeti Bajnokság I players
Kategoria Superiore players
Super League Greece 2 players
Expatriate footballers in Belgium
Serbian expatriate sportspeople in Belgium
Expatriate footballers in Greece
Serbian expatriate sportspeople in Greece
Expatriate footballers in Malaysia
Serbian expatriate sportspeople in Malaysia
Expatriate footballers in Hungary
Serbian expatriate sportspeople in Hungary
Expatriate footballers in Albania
Serbian expatriate sportspeople in Albania